Casque d'Or ("Golden Helmet") is a 1952 French historical drama film directed by Jacques Becker. It is a Belle Époque tragedy, the story of an ill-fated love affair between characters played by Simone Signoret and Serge Reggiani. The story was loosely based on an infamous love triangle between the prostitute Amélie Élie and the Apache gang leaders Manda and Leca, which was the subject of much sensational newspaper reporting during 1902.

It was shot at the Billancourt Studios in Paris and on location around the city. The film's sets were designed by the art director Jean d'Eaubonne.

Plot
Marie (Simone Signoret), a beautiful woman of the demimonde known for her cap of golden hair, is unhappily involved with Roland, a charmless criminal who is a part of a local syndicate headed by Félix Leca. At a dance, Marie is introduced to the handsome young carpenter and ex-convict Georges Manda by his old friend Raymond, who is now also with Leca's gang. Manda and Raymond, having spent time in prison together, have a strong bond of friendship. Instantly, Marie is visibly attracted to Manda, much to Roland's chagrin. After Marie and Manda find themselves locked in an intimate dance, Roland attempts to bully Manda, who then promptly knocks him out cold.

Observing Marie's growing interest in Manda, Roland's jealousy builds. Unbeknownst to Roland, Marie has learned that Manda has a fiancee and she has tried to forget about him, resigning herself to life as a gun moll. However, Manda shows up at a nightclub to take Marie from Roland, who then decides to fight him out back as several syndicate members watch, including Raymond. Leca is present as well, since he has asked Marie to meet him at the club with an answer to his offer to "buy" her from Roland. Outside the club, what begins as an ordinary fistfight is suddenly intensified when Leca deviously elevates the danger by throwing a knife on the ground between the two men. Manda gains control of the knife and stabs Roland, killing him. Manda's fighting skills appear to impress Leca, who offers him the late Roland's now-vacated spot in the gang. Manda declines.

Meanwhile, a man inside the club who has noticed trouble brewing outside has alerted the authorities, and the police arrive at the scene while the syndicate members are attempting to remove Roland's lifeless body. As a result, everyone flees, including Marie, who seeks refuge away from the syndicate at a nearby village. Roland's body is discovered by police, who begin a murder investigation. As it turns out, the man who had tipped off the police of the nightclub killing later turns up dead himself, under mysterious circumstances; the syndicate members quietly celebrate and, at Leca's urging, contribute money towards his funeral.

Manda decides it is best to flee town. He is contacted by Marie and the two meet at her village. The two lovers live an idyllic life together until Leca intervenes by using his connections with a crooked cop to frame Raymond for Roland's killing. Leca believes his plan will force Manda out of hiding to confess in order to save his friend, bringing Marie under his control. When Manda hears the news of Raymond's wrongful arrest for murder, he is unable to remain at peace with Marie. She awakens in the morning to discover that Manda has returned to town to turn himself in to the police. At the police station, Manda writes out a sworn confession explaining that he, not Raymond, killed Roland during a knife fight. Meanwhile, Marie goes to Leca and pleads with him to help Manda escape from police custody, sensing there is no other way out for her lover. Leca leads her on and forces his way onto her; desperate, she allows him to have his way with her.

The police decide to charge Raymond as an accessory to the homicide rather than free him. At the police station, Raymond learns that Leca was behind the frame-up. He later shares this information with Manda while they are being transported between jails, suddenly motivating the two men to pull off a daring escape from police custody, with Marie's help. However, Raymond is mortally wounded by police gunfire during the action.

Later, as Raymond lay dying among Leca's gang at the local tavern, Manda hunts down Leca to avenge his friend's certain death and his now doomed love. At Leca's house, Manda discovers that Marie has recently been in Leca's bed; he realizes Leca has used the situation to have his way with Marie. Enraged, Manda finally locates Leca and chases him down in broad daylight into a police station, whereupon he grabs a pistol from a holster in front of stunned officers, barricading the two men into a side room and firing repeatedly at a trembling Leca, killing him. Finally apprehended by police, Manda's fate is now sealed.

With the two killings on his hands, Manda is sentenced to die by the guillotine. A broken Marie watches in horror from the window of an upstairs flat overlooking a courtyard as her condemned lover is being executed.

Cast
Simone Signoret as Marie 'Casque d'Or'
Serge Reggiani as Georges Manda
Claude Dauphin as Félix Leca
Raymond Bussières as Raymond
William Sabatier as Roland Dupuis
Gaston Modot as Danard
Paul Barge as Police Insp. Juliani
Odette Barencey as La mère d'Eugène
Loleh Bellon as Léonie Danard
Dominique Davray as Julie
 Jacqueline Cantrelle

Final scene
The film's final sequence is famous. After Manda's surrender to the police, the film shows Marie arriving at night, with one of Leca's ex-henchmen, at a cheap inn in the city, where she rents a room. The filmmakers provide no immediate clues for the audience as to why this is happening. Only later is it revealed that the room in which she is staying overlooks the courtyard in which her lover, Manda, is to be executed. British film critic Roy Armes wrote: "Becker shows all the hurried ugliness and squalor that surrounds the guillotine, so that we feel this execution to be an affront to humanity."

French New Wave director François Truffaut, who was a fervent admirer of the film's director, Jacques Becker, particularly praised this scene. He wrote: "If you're at all interested in how stories are constructed, you cannot fail to admire the ingenuity of the plot, particularly the strong, oblique, unexpected way it gets abruptly to Manda's execution in a scene that is as beautiful as it is mysterious, as the Casque d'Or [Marie] arrives in the middle of the night at a disreputable hotel. When I or any of my fellow scenarists are in trouble, we often say to each other, 'How about a Casque d'Or solution?'"

Reception
The Lexikon des Internationalen Films (Encyclopedia of International Film) wrote: "With Casque d'Or, Jacques Becker has made the most stylistically clear and filmically convincing film about belle époque. The drawing of the shady milieu, the deeply human interpretation of the love relationship between Manda and Marie – that is fascinatingly dramatised and convinced not least by the excellent actors Simone Signoret and Serge Reggiani. Becker proves to be a master of character representation in mastering a poetic realism that only a few directors of this time succeeded in doing."

Das große Personenlexikon des Films (The Great Biographical Dictionary of Film Persons) found: "His milieu portrait from the turn of the century,  the clearly structured story about a gangster rivalry, is considered Becker's masterpiece".

Reclams Filmführer (Reclam's Film Guide) says: "Becker was not interested in making a "historical gangster film"; he created a very unusual film about the "belle époque", in which people are more important than events, feelings more real than criminal involvement. A film of unusual beauty, strict will to style, clear dramaturgy – probably Becker's masterpiece."

Buchers Enzyklopädie des Films (Bucher's encyclopedia of film) reads: "Becker gives a masterly account of Paris at the turn of the century, both in the set-up and in the drawing of the characters. Despite the bleak plot, the film has a life-affirming trait, especially in the exterior shots, which is primarily due to the strong charisma of Simone Signoret in the leading role."

Cultural references
In 1986 the French Government issued a postage stamp dedicated to centenary of the French cinema depicting Jacques Becker's "Casque d'Or".

In Don Winslow's novel Satori, the main female character Solange Picard watches Casque d'Or over and over in a cinema in Saigon and cries at the end of it each time.

Proposed remake
In 1965, MGM announced it would make a musical remake of the film produced by Jacques Bar, directed by Julien Duvivier and starring Ann-Margret.

References

External links
 
 
 Casque d'or: Tenderness and Violence an essay by Philip Kemp at the Criterion Collection

1952 films
1950s historical drama films
1952 crime drama films
French historical drama films
French crime drama films
Films set in Paris
Films about prostitution in Paris
Films set in the 1900s
Films about real people
Films directed by Jacques Becker
Films produced by Robert and Raymond Hakim
French black-and-white films
Films shot in Paris
Films shot at Billancourt Studios
1950s English-language films
Belle Époque
1950s French films